Dezful County is in Khuzestan province, Iran. The capital of the county is the city of Dezful. At the 2006 census, the county's population was 384,851 in 31,291 households. The following census in 2011 counted 423,552 people in 107,746 households. At the 2016 census the county's population was 443,971, in 125,351 households.

Administrative divisions

The population history and structural changes of Dezful County's administrative divisions over three consecutive censuses are shown in the following table. The latest census shows four districts, 11 rural districts, and nine cities.

References

 

Counties of Khuzestan Province